Maddick is a surname. Notable people with the surname include:

Edmund Distin Maddick (1857–1939), English surgeon and pioneer of cinema
Kevin Maddick (born 1974), English footballer

See also
Maddock (surname)